In particle physics, quarkonium (from quark and -onium, pl. quarkonia) is a flavorless meson whose constituents are a heavy quark and its own antiquark, making it both a neutral particle and its own antiparticle.

Light quarks

Light quarks (up, down, and strange) are much less massive than the heavier quarks, and so the physical states actually seen in experiments (η, η′, and π0 mesons) are quantum mechanical mixtures of the light quark states. The much larger mass differences between the charm and bottom quarks and the lighter quarks results in states that are well defined in terms of a quark–antiquark pair of a given flavor.

Heavy quarks
Examples of quarkonia are the J/ψ meson (the ground state of charmonium) and the  meson (bottomonium). Because of the high mass of the top quark, toponium (θ meson) does  not exist, since the top quark decays through the electroweak interaction before a bound state can form (a rare example of a weak process proceeding more quickly than a strong process). Usually, the word "quarkonium" refers only to charmonium and bottomonium, and not to any of the lighter quark–antiquark states.

Charmonium

In the following table, the same particle can be named with the spectroscopic notation or with its mass. In some cases excitation series are used: ψ′ is the first excitation of ψ (which, for historical reasons, is called  particle); ψ″ is a second excitation, and so on. That is, names in the same cell are synonymous.

Some of the states are predicted, but have not been identified; others are unconfirmed. The quantum numbers of the X(3872) particle have been measured recently by the LHCb experiment at CERN. This measurement shed some light on its identity, excluding the third option among the three envisioned, which are:
 a charmonium hybrid state
 a   molecule
 a candidate for the 11D2 state

In 2005, the BaBar experiment announced the discovery of a new state: Y(4260). CLEO and Belle have since corroborated these observations. At first, Y(4260) was thought to be a charmonium state, but the evidence suggests more exotic explanations, such as a D "molecule", a 4-quark construct, or a hybrid meson.

Notes:
[] Needs confirmation.
[†] Interpretation as a 1−− charmonium state not favored.
[‡] Predicted, but not yet identified.

Bottomonium

In the following table, the same particle can be named with the spectroscopic notation or with its mass.
Some of the states are predicted, but have not been identified; others are unconfirmed.

Notes:
[*] Preliminary results. Confirmation needed.

The (1S) state was discovered by the E288 experiment team, headed by Leon Lederman, at Fermilab in 1977, and was the first particle containing a bottom quark to be discovered. On 21 December 2011, the (3P) state was the first particle discovered in the Large Hadron Collider; the discovery article was first posted on arXiv. In April 2012, Tevatron's DØ experiment confirmed the result in a paper published in Physical Review D.
The J = 1 and J = 2 states were first resolved by the CMS experiment in 2018.

Toponium

The theta meson hasn't been and isn't expected to be observed in nature, as top quarks decay too fast to form mesons in nature (and be detected).

QCD and quarkonium
The computation of the properties of mesons in quantum chromodynamics (QCD) is a fully non-perturbative one. As a result, the only general method available is a direct computation using lattice QCD (LQCD) techniques. However, for heavy quarkonium, other techniques are also effective.

The light quarks in a meson move at relativistic speeds, since the mass of the bound state is much larger than the mass of the quark. However, the speed of the charm and the bottom quarks in their respective quarkonia is sufficiently small for relativistic effects in these states to be much reduced. It is estimated that the velocity, is roughly 0.3 times the speed of light for charmonia and roughly 0.1 times the speed of light for bottomonia. This technique is called non-relativistic QCD (NRQCD).

NRQCD has also been quantized as a lattice gauge theory, which provides another technique for LQCD calculations to use. Good agreement with the bottomonium masses has been found, and this provides one of the best non-perturbative tests of LQCD. For charmonium masses the agreement is not as good, but the LQCD community is actively working on improving their techniques. Work is also being done on calculations of such properties as widths of quarkonia states and transition rates between the states.

An early, but still effective, technique uses models of the effective potential to calculate masses of quarkonium states. In this technique, one uses the fact that the motion of the quarks that comprise the quarkonium state is non-relativistic to assume that they move in a static potential, much like non-relativistic models of the hydrogen atom. One of the most popular potential models is the so-called Cornell (or funnel) potential:

 

This potential has two parts. The first part, corresponds to the potential induced by one-gluon exchange between the quark and its anti-quark, and is known as the Coulombic part of the potential, since its  form is identical to the well-known Coulombic potential induced by the electromagnetic force.

The second part, is known as the confinement part of the potential, and parameterizes the poorly understood non-perturbative effects of QCD. Relativistic and other effects can be incorporated into this approach by adding extra terms to the potential, much as is done for the model hydrogen atom in non-relativistic quantum mechanics.

It is popular because it allows for accurate predictions of quarkonium parameters without a lengthy lattice computation, and provides a separation between the short-distance Coulombic effects and the long-distance confinement effects that can be useful in understanding the quark / anti-quark force generated by QCD.

Quarkonia have been suggested as a diagnostic tool of the formation of the quark–gluon plasma: Both disappearance and enhancement of their formation depending on the yield of heavy quarks in plasma can occur.

See also
 OZI rule

References

Mesons
Onia